This article uses Eastern name order when mentioning individuals. 

 is a 2021 Japanese romantic drama film directed by Shuto Rin and starring Yamada Anna, Sakuma Ryuto and Imou Haruka. It is based on Wataya Risa's novel of the same title.

Production and release
The film was produced by TV Man Union.

It was first released through movie theaters on 22 October 2021, being distributed by Showgate and the DVD&Blu-ray have been confirmed to be releasing on 13 April 2022, which will be distributed by Amuse Soft.

It is available to watch on the TV Asahi-affiliated streaming platform TELASA since 1 March 2022.

Plot
Ai is a third grade high school student who is very popular and diligent. She seems to have everything although she doesn't get the attention of Tatoe, a classmate she has a crush on since the first grade of high school because of his mysterious personality. One day, she happens to see Tatoe reading a letter and later finds out that the sender of that letter is Miyuki, a girl who suffers from diabetes, and that the two have a secret relationship. Ai decides to become close to Miyuki while hiding her feelings for Tatoe.

Cast

Main
 Yamada Anna as Kimura Ai
  as Nishimura Tatoe
  as Shindo Miyuki

Supporting
 Itaya Yuka as Kimura Yoriko
 Tanaka Misako as Shindo Izumi
 Hagiwara Masato as Nishimura Takashi
  as homeroom teacher Okanoya
  as teacher Fujitani
  as school nurse Moriya
  as Takeuchi Mika
  as Tada Ken

Accolades

References

External links
 Official website
 Unlock Your Heart on TELASA
 

Japanese romantic drama films
2020s Japanese-language films
2021 romantic drama films
Films based on Japanese novels
Showgate films